Cemre Kendirci (born 23 September 2004) is a Turkish artistic gymnast. She competed at the 2020 European Women's Artistic Gymnastics Championships in Mersin, Turkey.

She is a student of Suadiye Hacı Mustafa Tarman Anatolian High School in Istanbul.

Kendirci won the gold medal in the Vault event and the silver medal with her team mates at the 2019 Mediterranean Championships held in Cagliari, Italy.

References

External links
 

2004 births
Living people
People from Kadıköy
Sportspeople from Istanbul
Turkish female artistic gymnasts
21st-century Turkish women